Cheshmeh-ye Ali (also Romanized as Cheshmeh-ye ‘Alī and Chashmeh-ye ‘Alī; also known as Chashma ‘Al) is a village in Sefid Sang Rural District, Qalandarabad District, Fariman County, Razavi Khorasan Province, Iran. At the 2006 census, its population was 23, in 5 families.

References 

Populated places in Fariman County